

The Caudron C.161 was a lightweight French two-seat biplane designed by Caudron for sport or flight training use. A conventional biplane with a square fuselage powered by a  Salmson radial engine. It had two cockpits in tandem with dual controls in both, when not used as a trainer the controls could be removed from the rear cockpit. A variant, the C.168, with a more powerful  Anzani radial engine was also available.

Variants
C.161
Variant with a  Salmson 5Ac radial engine.
C.168
Variant with a  Anzani 6-cylinder radial engine.

Specifications (C.168)

References

1920s French sport aircraft
C.160
Biplanes
Aircraft first flown in 1927